Wallace Rudolph "Wally" West is a superhero appearing in American comic books published by DC Comics as the original Kid Flash and the third Flash. His power consists mainly of superhuman speed. The nephew of Iris West, he first appeared in Flash #110 (1959), which depicted his transformation into Kid Flash. Under the mantle of Kid Flash, Wally was depicted as a teenage sidekick to his uncle-by-marriage, Barry Allen, and a founding member of the Teen Titans. After Barry's death in Crisis on Infinite Earths in 1985, Wally took on the role of the Flash from 1986 to 2009 in DC's main lineup until Barry returned in The Flash: Rebirth. Even so, Wally is a fan-favorite superhero and the fastest character to ever hold the mantle of the Flash. He would later return as the main Flash since 2021, as part of the Infinite Frontier relaunch.

In his debut as the Flash, Wally wears a distinct red and gold costume which, like his uncle, he traditionally stores compressed inside a ring. He later creates a costume directly out of Speed Force energy. Following his return in 2016, Wally is able to easily generate white lightning, which means his connection to the Speed Force is stronger than ever. During the first stage of his return, he temporarily wore an alternate red and silver costume when he wasn't the main Flash.

Generally portrayed as a white man with red hair and green eyes, Wally was reinterpreted biracial for DC's 2011 New 52 relaunch. A desire from fans to see the original interpretation of the character restored, however, led to Wally returning in 2016's DC Rebirth, while his New 52 reinterpretation was made into a separate character to avoid confusion.

Wally West has appeared in many other forms of media and was featured as the incarnation of the Flash in the Cartoon Network series Justice League, voiced by Michael Rosenbaum, and the 2010 film Justice League: Crisis on Two Earths, voiced by Josh Keaton. As Kid Flash, he appeared in Cartoon Network's Young Justice series, voiced by Jason Spisak.

Fictional character biography

Kid Flash

Wallace Rudolph West II, or Wally West, was created by John Broome and Carmine Infantino and introduced in The Flash #110 (1959). The character was the nephew of the existing Flash character's girlfriend and later wife, Iris West. During a visit to the Central City police laboratory where Barry Allen worked, the freak accident that gave Allen his powers repeated itself, bathing Wally in electrically charged chemicals. Now possessing the same powers as the Flash, West donned a smaller-sized copy of Barry Allen's Flash outfit and became the young crimefighter Kid Flash. Wally had a strained relationship with his own parents and often looked to his beloved aunt and uncle for moral support and guidance. He also operated as a lone superhero in his hometown, Blue Valley, Nebraska, when not partnering with the Flash.

This costume was later altered in The Flash #135 (1963) to one that would make him more visually distinctive. The original red was replaced with a costume that was primarily yellow with red leggings, gloves and lightning bolt emblem. The ear pieces initially remained yellow, but became red in later issues.

In addition to his appearances within the Flash title, the character was a founding member of the newly created Teen Titans, where he became friends with Dick Grayson, then known as Robin, later known as Nightwing. Sometime later, Wally contracted a mysterious illness that affected his entire bodily system; the more he used his speed powers, the faster his body deteriorated. This could have been caused by one of two things, Wally was a boy when the electrified chemicals altered his body, which was still developing and maturing (as opposed to Barry Allen, who was already an adult when his accident occurred) or when he was struck with a weapon during his time with the Teen Titans. As such, as Wally's body matured, his altered body chemistry was slowly killing him.

The Flash
During the 1985–1986 miniseries Crisis on Infinite Earths, Barry gave his life to save the Earth when destroying the antimatter cannon that was aimed at Earth. Initially unaware of this, Wally was coaxed by Jay Garrick into assisting the heroes against the Anti-Monitor's forces. During the final battle with the Anti-Monitor, Wally was struck by a blast of anti-matter energy, which cured his disease. In the aftermath of the conflict, Wally took on his fallen mentor's costume and identity.

The decision by DC Comics' editorial staff to radically change their fictional universe saw a number of changes to the status quo of the character. Wally West became the new Flash, but less powerful than his predecessor. For example, instead of being able to reach the speed of light, he could run just faster than that of sound. Also, the character had to eat vast quantities of food to maintain his metabolism.

Those changes were quickly followed up and 1987 saw the publication of a new Flash comic, initially written by Mike Baron. These stories focused not only on the Flash's superhero exploits, but the state of Wally's wealth. West won a lottery, bought a large mansion, and began dating beautiful women. The character's finances and luck continued to ebb and wane until The Flash vol. 2 #62, when his fortunes stabilized.

The 1990s also saw further modifications to the look of the character, with a modified uniform appearing in 1991. This modified costume altered the visual appearance of the traditional Flash costume, with a belt made of two connecting lightning bolts meeting in a "V" at the front (where Allen's costume had a single bolt in a horizontal band), removal of the wings from the top of his boots, a change in the material of his costume, and opaque lenses added to the eyes of his cowl. This modified design utilized elements of the costume designed by artist Dave Stevens for the live action television series The Flash.

A difficult encounter was made with a vicious foe, the first Reverse-Flash (Eobard Thawne). Thawne had been killed by Barry Allen shortly before Allen's death, but this version of Thawne was from a time period before he originally became Allen's enemy - also served to increase the speed of the character, forcing him to push past a psychological block he had placed on his powers. To prevent himself from truly "replacing" Barry, Wally had subconsciously limited his speed so that he could never become his mentor's equal, but when Thawne arrived in the present and briefly posed as Barry Allen, his bragging that he would become the true Flash forced Wally past this block, as he feared Thawne replacing Barry more than he feared himself doing so. After this encounter, he was again Barry Allen's equal in speed, and eventually became even faster. Though he still had not been able to recover Barry's vibrational/phasing abilities for a time (he could vibrate through objects but this would cause the object to explode), he gained several new powers that Barry never had. He was able to share/steal speed, use his speed to kinetically upgrade his attacks, and super heal others.

Writer Mark Waid expanded on the character's powers thematically and further redefined the character by introducing the Speed Force, an energy source that served as a pseudo-scientific explanation for his powers and that of other fictional speedsters within the DC Universe. Using this concept as a basis, the character's ability to tap into the Speed Force was used to expand his abilities. The character was now able to lend speed to other objects and people and create a costume directly out of Speed Force energy. Traditional powers such as the ability to vibrate through solid objects were also restored. Because of this, the Flash felt pressured into having to constantly be heroic 24/7. During this time, he joined the Justice League.

The 2000s saw writer Geoff Johns revitalize the character by introducing new versions of characters such as Zoom; making significant use of the Rogues; and marrying the character to longtime girlfriend Linda Park. Other changes included restoring the Flash to a secret identity; his identity had been public since shortly after Barry Allen's death, but the traumatic events of his first battle with Zoom prompted Wally to make a deal with the Spectre to erase his identity from public knowledge.

During the Identity Crisis crossover, Wally and Kyle Rayner learned Dr. Light's mindwipe by the original Justice League and the cause of the villain's transformation from a dangerous serial rapist to an ineffectual buffoon. When Dr. Light vows revenge against the League, Wally realizes that the villain is again a powerful threat. He then warns the Teen Titans and Outsiders not to underestimate Dr. Light, and later joins their fight against him.

In the miniseries Infinite Crisis, as a narrative device, Wally West and his family were seen leaving for an alternative reality. This allowed the character Bart Allen to become the fourth Flash and headline a relaunched third volume of the title, called The Flash: The Fastest Man Alive.

The critical reaction to this new version of the Flash was mixed and Bart was killed off in the final issue of the short-lived third volume. It was decided that Wally West should return, and the JLA/JSA story "The Lightning Saga" was used to return the character to Earth along with his wife and children, who appear to have aged several years.

The character next appeared in All Flash #1 (2007), seeking vengeance on those who had killed Bart Allen. This was followed by The Flash vol. 2, which resumed publication after the long hiatus with issue #231 (October 2007). The series found the character struggling with trying to raise his two super-powered twins, plagued by accelerated growth and their inexperience in the heroic game, a task made more difficult by Wally's unemployment, his inability to keep a steady job, and the mistrust of the League for his decision to bring two children into the fold. The series was canceled with issue #247 (February 2009).

In Final Crisis, the character was reunited with Barry Allen, who had returned to life. Later, in The Flash: Rebirth, Wally makes modifications on his costume to further differentiate himself from Barry due to them sharing the Flash identity with Jay Garrick.

Blackest Night
During the Blackest Night, Wally West assists Barry Allen in spreading the word to every hero on Earth about the rise of the Black Lantern Corps. When Black Hand brings back Nekron, Barry is attacked by an army of Black Lanterns, while struggling to fight them off, Wally comes to his rescue, bringing with him the Justice League & Teen Titans, Bart Allen, the Kid Flash, among them. The three Flashes fight their way through Black Lanterns and charge at Nekron. Before they can strike, the Black Lantern Guardian Scar attacks them, attempting to convince them into becoming Black Lanterns. Right after, Hal Jordan and the leaders of the seven Lantern Corps arrive to assist. The heroes attack the Black Lanterns, but when Black Hand reanimates Batman's corpse as a Black Lantern, the resulting emotional shock allows the Black Lantern rings to latch onto the resurrected heroes, transforming Superman, Superboy, Wonder Woman, Green Arrow, Black Canary, and Kid Flash into Black Lanterns. Black Lantern Bart Allen attacks Barry Allen, and the two brawl for a moment before Wally fights him off. A pair of Black Lantern Rings then lock onto Barry and Hal. Wally flees with Barry, with Barry telling him to stay and protect himself and Bart. Barry and Hal then flee the scene to avoid becoming Black Lanterns.

Return: The New 52 and DC Rebirth
Following the 2011 reboot of the DC comics universe, Wally West appears to have never existed. A seemingly new interpretation of Wally West was introduced in The Flash vol. 4 Annual #3. Originally portrayed as the New 52 version of the classic and original character and the biracial son of Rudy West, this biracial Wally, later renamed Wallace West to avoid confusion, was retconned in DC Rebirth #1 as being the cousin of Wally West and son of the New 52 Reverse-Flash, Daniel West. Both cousins are explained as having been named after their great-grandfather.

The existence of Wally West is hinted at in the final issue of Titans Hunt, in which the various original Teen Titans remember their bond to each other, but realize that they are still forgetting an important final member of their team. They look out to the ocean as lightning strikes.

Wally West is reintroduced to DC continuity a week later in a DC Rebirth story. The story reveals that following the Flashpoint event, Wally became lost in the Speed Force for 10 years. While trapped, he came to realize that Barry had not been responsible for the mutation of the New Earth universe into Prime Earth but that an unknown entity had used Barry's time-traveling to fundamentally alter reality. The fallout of the recent Darkseid War allowed Wally to try and reach out to his former friends in the hopes of either returning or warning them of the truth. Each attempt caused him to fall further into the Speed Force. After realizing that not even Linda could remember him, Wally sank into desolation and chose to appear before his uncle, Barry, one last time to thank him for the life he had given him. Just before Wally disappeared, Barry remembered him and dragged him out of the Speed Force. Wally's presence integrates his Pre-Flashpoint history to the new timeline to accommodate his existence, resetting his past and those who associated with him. Following a tearful reunion, Wally gave Barry his warning of the true source of the universal change and the dangers to come. Although the two decide to keep Wally's return secret from Iris based on Wally's own experience with Linda, Barry encourages him to return to the Titans, but also recommends that he don a new costume to reflect that he is the Flash rather than 'Kid Flash'. Wally goes to the Titans, and through both physical contact to Nightwing, Donna Troy, Arsenal, Tempest and Lilith Clay with the Speed Force reminding them of their memories with him, creating a new history. After an emotional reunion with his friends, he tells them of the situation. Wally believes that the unknown entity will attack again to prevent them from finding out the truth, which they will do together as Titans.

Directly after the events in Titans: Rebirth, Lilith has Wally repeat the story of his return for her to use it as a means of making the mental connections between him, herself and the Titans stronger. While doing this, she notices the most powerful thought in Wally's mind is that of Linda Park, which sparks various, but supportive, reactions from the other Titans. Nightwing encourages Wally to seek Linda out and try and make new memories with her. Elsewhere, Linda is still puzzled by Wally's sudden presence in her life and decides to investigate him further. During a confrontation with Abra Kadabra, Wally is forced to push himself so fast that he is sent into the Speed Force while trying to save her and the other Titans from being killed by Kadabra, but in a conversation with a manifestation of his memories of Linda, Wally is encouraged not to give up on the idea that he can make a new relationship with her in this timeline, subsequently using his memories of the Titans as a new 'lightning-rod' to return to Earth. Afterwards, Wally is visited by Superman, who confirms that he, like Wally, remembers the world that existed before history was 'edited'.

Later, Deathstroke wanted to use the Speed Force to save his son and takes out Wally. Wallace West and Damian Wayne managed to save Wally, but Damian Wayne had to stop Wally West's heart momentarily, making Wally West have a heart pacer. After that adventure, while on a mission with the Titans, Wally learned that he has the ability to go fast and stop time as well.

After a battle against Psimon, Mister Twister, and the Key, Wally used too much of his abilities, and he seemingly dies. However, Kid Flash (Wallace West) senses Wally's "death" and rushes to find him. After noticing Wally West "dead", Kid Flash senses that Wally is not completely dead and he revives him by jumpstarting his heart, curing Wally of his pacemaker condition. Wally West then helps the Titans defeat Donna Troy's evil self from an alternate future, Troia, and the other villains.

When Barry confronts Wally about how he has not made any real effort to make contact with Iris, rebuild things with Linda, or even try to make a new life for himself, Wally tries to compensate for this by tracking down Frances Kane, but his initial contact with her also re-awakens her old psychological issues, causing her to attack Wally before he calms her down by confessing his own fears about his current circumstances. Inspired by this conversation, Wally calls Dick Grayson to help him purchase an apartment. However, Wally is unaware that his friend-turned-foe Hunter Zolomon has returned. Now in a position of authority in the 25th century, Zolomon sends the Renegades into the past to arrest Iris for the murder of Eobard Thawne with the intention of provoking a war between the Flashes to make 'the true Flash' stronger through tragedy. After the Flash Family defeated Gorilla Grodd in a battle, Wally meets Iris for the first time after his disappearance. He begins remembering Pre-Flashpoint memories after Iris remembers him. However, a confrontation with his former ally Hunter Zolomon provokes Barry and Wally into conflict, as Hunter convinces Wally that the Speed Force must be destroyed to release those missing allies still 'trapped' within it, including Wally's children, Jai and Iris West, Max Mercury and Impulse. Wally became determined to break the Speed Force open in a bid to free them which led to a frantic chase, with Barry Allen trying to stop Wally before he did something drastic, remembering all too well the damage he himself had done to the time-stream attempting to stop his mother's murder during the Flashpoint event. Unfortunately, Wally proved himself to be the true Fastest Man Alive and was able to outrun Barry and create the break he wanted. The resulting explosion sent both heroes back to Barry's hometown of Central City and into the clutches of a gloating Zoom who quickly revealed that his true intention in reminding Wally about the existence of his children was to trick Wally into breaking the Force Barrier - a cosmic barricade that concealed energies that could be tapped into by the right people in much the same way that the Speed Force empowers speedsters. These energies include the Sage Force - seemingly based around telepathic and telekinetic powers - and the Strength Force. Zoom discovered the existence of these energies by reading 25th-century history books and determined a way to tap into these energies as well as the Speed Force once the Force Barrier was broken. He also donned a replica of Barry Allen's costume, declaring himself the one true Flash, before deciding that he would spare Barry and Wally the pain of their future lives by ending them now.

Heroes in Crisis
During the Heroes in Crisis story arc, Wally was initially believed to be one of the massacre's highest-profile victims at the superhero rehabilitation facility known as Sanctuary, but is later revealed to be not only alive but actually the real culprit of the murders. Wally explains all in his confession, one of the many recorded video transcripts that Wally himself sent to Lois Lane, while identifying himself as "The Puddler", that he's felt "alone" since his return, as his family remains wiped from existence, with no one even to remember them, except him. These tortured memories are what led him to Sanctuary in the first place, but he found no comfort there, instead, he relates how he still felt alone because he didn't see the same kind of pain in its other residents, and the program's anonymity only compounded his feelings of isolation. Wally therefore did some digging of his own into Sanctuary's resident records and uncovered a truth that he had been denying. Every one of the heroes at Sanctuary were in fact coping and trying to overcome their own personal traumas, just as Wally was. Uncovering all this information at superspeed led to a flood of emotional experiences that momentarily allowed Wally to understand he wasn't so alone after all. While this realization might have initially given Wally some comfort, it all came to him in a comparative instant. Instead of helping to heal him, the onslaught of emotions broke him. In turn, he momentarily lost control of the powers of the Speed Force contained within him and in another fateful instant, the powers of the Speed Force were unleashed on the other heroes within Sanctuary, killing them instantly.

Wally accessing Sanctuary's files had tripped the facility's alarm, and the moment of Wally's breakdown happened, Harley and Booster were immersed in their respective virtual reality therapy sessions. Taking advantage of that happy coincidence, Wally used his powers to deliver a superspeed sleight of hand at Harley and Booster's expense. As each exited their VR chambers, he reprogrammed them and tricked the pair into thinking they had left the chambers, when in fact they had not. Instead of seeing the actual massacre, what each instead saw was the other murdering Wally.

From there, Wally stole Booster's time-traveling tech, went five days into the future, killed his future self and brought his future body back to present day to leave at the scene. Wally's machinations are what led Booster to discover that dead Wally's body was five days too old. Wally then relocated all the bodies of the others he had slain, staging the murders to place himself above suspicion, and set up Harley and Booster as the prime suspects instead. To complete the subterfuge, Wally then destroyed Sanctuary's computer and robot attendants, and scribbled the now-infamous "The puddlers are all dead" on Sanctuary's living room wall. He successfully misdirected everyone involved in the investigation until Ted Kord, Booster Gold, Batgirl and Harley Quinn figured out that Wally was the key to the murders, and they devised a way to track Wally's time disturbance by utilizing Skeets and Kord Industries tech.

They show up just as Wally is about to kill five-days-older-Wally, and five-days Wally reveals that after he accidentally killed everyone in Sanctuary, he didn't travel back in time to “unmake” his mistake because that's what Barry did during Flashpoint, instead he sent the confession files to Lois Lane to try to “make up for what happened,” telling the world what he'd done at Sanctuary, and encouraging people to get help before they made the same mistakes he did. Five-days-older Wally reveals that this is the same thing that happened to him five days ago - that he also didn't kill the older Wally. Booster Gold explains that they can still “close” the loop, even without the dead body of five-days-older Wally. They can go to the 25th Century and “speed-clone” older Wally. Then younger Wally can take that cloned body back to the past. The Justice League eventually arrived and arrested Wally for the murders.

In The Flash #761, it was revealed that Eobard Thawne was responsible for manipulating Wally into killing the heroes at Sanctuary. Later this whole story was recollected in The Flash Annual #1 (2021), stating that Wally West was not responsible for these deaths, and it was revealed that Speed Force itself had actually caused it when trying to expel Savitar from its corridors.

Doomsday Clock
In the "Watchmen" sequel "Doomsday Clock," Lex Luthor mentioned to Lois Lane that someone has been undermining creation, like what Doctor Manhattan did with Wally West and the Justice Society of America. When Doctor Manhattan altered the multiverse and created the New 52 Universe, Wally, prior to being freed in DC Universe: Rebirth #1, briefly escaped the Speed Force to warn Doctor Manhattan that he knows what the latter did and that the heroes of the DC Universe will stop him. Wally was pulled back into the Speed Force afterward.

Flash-Forward and Generation
Wally is later recruited by Tempus Fuginaut who wants him to restore the balance between the Light and Dark Multiverses. After saving several universes from being consumed by dark-matter, Wally finds the Mobius Chair that once belonged to Metron and makes a deal with Fuginaut to return his children Jai and Iris, who were trapped in the Dark Multiverse, to his wife Linda Park. But after sitting upon the chair, Wally, in addition to obtaining a cosmic level of knowledge, also obtains the powers of Doctor Manhattan, after he put a fraction of his power into the chair. (Wally's costume and lightning proceeded to turn to the blue of Manhattan, with Manhattan's logo forming on his forehead, and Wally now losing nearly all sense of emotion he had and now seeking logic and knowledge). After finding out that Doctor Manhattan did not completely heal the Universe after Doomsday Clock, Wally begins using his newfound powers to set about restoring the timeline.

Infinite Frontier
Following the 2021 event Infinite Frontier #0, Wally is restored as the primary Flash and central character in The Flash series since #768, after Barry Allen's departure to join Justice Incarnate, eventually again donning the costume he designed during The Flash: Rebirth events. Wally's first storyline in the solo title sees him travel through the timeline as he attempts to prevent a destructive release of something in the Speed Force, which sees him meet his daughter, Iris, in the future as an accomplished Flash. In the arc's conclusion, in The Flash Annual 2021, Wally is thrown back to the moment of his greatest torment: the explosion at Sanctuary which killed his friends. He is unburdened by the revelation that this was not his fault, but rather that of the same Speed Force phenomenon, caused by the mad speedster Savitar and the Speed Force's attempts to expel him from its interior. With help from Mister Terrific, Barry Allen, Green Arrow, and the past Roy Harper shortly before he died at Sanctuary, Wally is able to bring Savitar back with him to the present. Although Savitar easily overcomes Superman and Batman, Barry tells Wally to step up, making use of his superior bond to the Speed Force to defeat, depower, and imprison Savitar once again. Fully Redeemed and more powerful than ever, Wally returns to Linda and the kids, enthusiastic to serve as Central City's Flash once again. Sometime later, Wally shares an emotional reunion with a newly resurrected Roy at the Teen Titans Academy.

Powers and abilities

Wally's primary superpower is his ability to control the speed at which his body vibrates and to move and think at Super-Speed, which he uses primarily to run at extreme superhuman velocities. His power is originated from his mainline-connection to the Speed Force: a vaguely-defined extra-dimensional and infinite energy source from which most speedster heroes gain their powers. Wally West is the Fastest Flash, being even faster than Barry Allen. He has been confirmed to be the fastest being in the entire DC Multiverse. 
 
While most to all speedsters can make a connection and draw upon this force, Wally "mainlines" power from the Speed Force itself and cannot be cut off from the source. This connection to the Speed Force grants him unique abilities that other speedsters lack, such as lending and taking speed (which manifests in different ways, ranging from becoming speedsters themselves to bolstering others metabolisms and healing abilities, allowing them to recover from injuries in a fraction of the normal time), as well as absorbing kinetic energy in a less direct manner; he once absorbed the kinetic energy of the entire planet Earth while standing at the North Pole when his teammates were forced to move the planet to prevent possible earthquakes. Wally has also found a way to create a costume out of pure Speed Force energy.

Like all Flashes, Wally is surrounded by a protective aura that allows him to resist the heat created by the pressure of compressed air caused by moving at super speed as well as other environmental consequences of moving at such velocities. It is not known how Wally is able to circumvent the damage moving at such great speeds would normally have on the environment, but it has been hypothesized that his protective aura allows him to "sidestep" such environmental consequences. Because of his powers and connection to the Speed Force, he can run at varying speeds for extended periods of time without needing rest or causing damage to his body. It is his connection to the Speed Force that constantly rejuvenates him while running, making it so he does not literally feed upon his own body to generate the energy for super speed. Even so, he has a sped-up metabolism and finds it necessary to eat often and in great quantities to help supply the chemical energy needed.

Using his abilities, Wally can run at such speed that he can run on water, create powerful vortices with his arms or body, and vibrate at such speeds that he becomes invisible to the naked eye. Wally can also match the vibrational constant of solid objects and vibrate through them, passing his molecules through the spaces in between the atoms and molecules of the matter he is vibrating through, however, Wally accidentally destabilizes whatever he passes through, causing it to explode. While this has its drawbacks, Wally has learned to use this offensively in battle. Since Rebirth 2016, Wally improves this ability and can vibrate through objects without causing them to explode.

Instead of using the cosmic treadmill as his uncle Barry, Wally can use his speed to travel through time. In Flash #150, he traveled back to the events of Crisis on Infinite Earths and battled the Anti-Monitor, speed-blitzing him until his shell was destroyed. He also outran death to the edge of the universe and beyond, where death didn't even exist and continued to run to get Linda back. There was a comic series titled The Human Race in which Wally ran faster than instant teleportation, Reaching Trans-Time Velocity. The Flash vol 2 #177 had Wally outrun the gravitational pull of a black hole. Using Jessie Quick's speed formula combined with his speed steal, Wally can temporally accelerate to the point where he escapes linear time, essentially allowing him to function like the chronokinetic Zoom.

Wally's connection to the Speed Force also grants him low-to-high electrokinetic abilities. He generates large amounts of lightning while moving at super speed, as well as whenever he is angered. On certain occasions, Wally has been able to project arcs of Speed Force lightning, such as when he is lending speed, or when he was using the Speed Force to restore the memories of the Titans, during DC Rebirth. Wally can also absorb electrical attacks and rebound them with ten times the force.

Wally West is the Fastest Flash and is arguably the fastest being that has ever existed, as said by Max Mercury—and it has been remarked that Wally and Barry are the only two speedsters that were fast enough to even outrun death itself. Wally himself has performed several feats and made several references to be faster than Barry and having surpassed him.

Wally is fast enough to easily break all the speed barriers and even enter the Speed Force. Wally has, on several occasions, traveled much faster than light and entered and exited the Speed Force by his own volition. He has shown that he can achieve practically any speed he wishes and that there are no limits to his speed. 

Wally has even become so fast and so powerful, that he became faster than the Speed Force itself.

Some interpretations of Wally are shown as having above-average strength. In the Justice League episode "The Brave and the Bold Part 2", the gorilla Solovar tells Wally that he weighed around 400  lbs; Wally then proceeded to lift Solovar and run to safety.

Wally is also a skilled science prodigy. In some versions, like Young Justice, Wally uses these skills to recreate the accident that gave Barry his powers by himself, granting himself his own powers. Like his mentor, Wally understands what his speed enables him to do, and uses his knowledge of physics to his advantage in battle. He has extensive knowledge and experience with Time-Travel and the Multiverse, and was also considered by Michael Holt, aka Mister Terrific, to be one of the smartest people he knew, and was given a job as a mechanic/engineer at TerrificTech.

After his return to the DC Universe, Wally is said to be even faster than before. Titans (2016) #5 issue, established that the Speed Force is inside Wally more than ever before. He can generate white lightning, which combines all the colors of the Speed Force. Also in DC Rebirth, Wally learned that he can sense when time has been manipulated, as well as listen to the Speed Force, which allows him to sense disruptions in the space-time continuum.

Wally has had some hand-to-hand combat training, and is skilled in Judo.

Allies and friends
Wally's father, Rudolph West (a Manhunter agent), was presumed deceased following an explosion in Cuba during the Invasion series. He reappeared years later at, among other places, his ex-wife Mary West's (Wally's mother) second wedding. They both later attended Wally and Linda's wedding.

While they disagree regularly, Wally has developed an odd friendship/respect with Batman, who has more than once made it clear that those feelings are mutual.

Like his predecessors, West is best friends with the Green Lantern of his time (Kyle Rayner). Wally also retained a close friendship with Kyle's predecessor, Hal Jordan, who often looked out for Wally even while he was the Spectre. His best friend is Dick Grayson, who served with Wally on the Teen Titans as the first Robin and served as Wally's best man at his wedding.

The members of the New Teen Titans, the team Wally served on as Kid Flash, have reappeared several times throughout his life. Although they are not always in close contact with one another, the team consider each other family; Wally is no exception.

Supporting cast
Wally has developed an extensive supporting cast over the duration of his comic series that began in 1987. A few are former villains and adversaries, such as Pied Piper, Speed Demon, and Chunk.

Linda Park-West – Wally West's girlfriend and later wife. She is a Korean-American television reporter for Keystone City, although she later goes to medical school. Park is West's "lightning rod" when traveling in the Speed Force. She first appeared in The Flash (vol. 2) #28 and was created by William Messner-Loebs.
Mary West – Wally's mother.
Iris West Allen – Wally's aunt, returned from the future. Iris was a role model for Wally growing up and one of the inspirations behind his career as the Flash.
Dr. Tina McGee – A scientist/nutritionist with whom Wally had a brief romantic involvement.
Dr. Jerry McGee (a.k.a. Speed Demon, Speed McGee) – Tina's husband and former super-speed villain.
Frances Kane (a.k.a. Magenta) – A former love interest of West who later joins the Rogues and becomes a supervillain.
Connie Noleski – A model and girlfriend of Wally's in his early career as the Flash. She is currently married to Chunk.
Chester P. Runk (a.k.a. Chunk) – A brilliant physicist who became a walking black hole after a matter-transmitting machine he invented imploded during its first test.
Mason Trollbridge – The former kid sidekick of a hard-edged Depression-era crimefighter known as the Clipper.
Pied Piper – One of Barry Allen's former Rogues whom Wally and Linda befriended. Piper even confessed his homosexuality to Wally on a rooftop while in discussion with him about the Joker.
Jay Garrick – The original Flash. Currently out of semi-retirement and a member of the Justice Society of America.
Jesse Quick – The daughter of Liberty Belle and Johnny Quick, Jesse is a second generation superhero and speedster like her father.
Max Mercury – The Zen Master of Speed.
Bart Allen (Kid Flash) – Barry and Iris Allen's grandson from the future. Originally codenamed Impulse. He was a member of the Teen Titans when he took on Wally's old identity.
Ashley Zolomon – Current Rogue Profiler with the Keystone City PD and former wife of Hunter Zolomon.
Jai West and Iris West – Wally and Linda's children. Aged 1 chronologically, but physically about 8 due to an unstable connection to the Speed Force. Wally had to teach them at super-speed, so they are mentally about the same age as they are physically. Following their nearly being killed by their powers, all of it was transferred to Iris, who became the new Impulse.

Group Affiliations
Wally is a founding member of the Teen Titans, the New Teen Titans, the Titans, Justice League Europe, Justice League Task Force, the "JLA" incarnation of the Justice League, and Justice League Elite, among other affiliations.

Other versions

Armageddon 2001
In the Armageddon 2001 crossover, a possible future shows Wally has married and fathered a son. The Wests are forced to move into the Witness Protection Program to escape a mobster that can discern secrets with a touch. Wally's son gains his super-speed, but not his protective aura. After defeating the mobster and his older Rogues Gallery, Wally manages to pass on his abilities to his son, granting him the much-needed aura.

Walter West/The Dark Flash
The Flash vol. 2 #150–159 (1999–2000) introduces a version of Wally named Walter West, also known as the Dark Flash, who appeared in the main DC universe after Wally and Linda were apparently killed in a fight with Abra Kadabra after he tried to dispose of Linda by sending her into Walter's reality, prompting Walter to travel back to Wally's world to take his place in recognition of his other self's sacrifice. This version of Wally is revealed to be an older, scarred, more powerful and experienced version from another reality within Hypertime, who was unable to save Linda from death at Kobra's hands. This made Walter a darker hero similar to Batman in The Dark Knight Returns storyline. After Walter's presence in the main DC Universe starts to cause other realities in Hypertime to bleed over into the main one, Superman and Wonder Woman force Walter to transverse Hypertime and return home. Although he leaves the main DC Universe, he appears to never make it back to his own reality. He seems to go from reality to reality with no success. After Hypertime was abandoned by DC, Walter West's continued existence becomes unclear. Dark Flash/Walter West appears as an alternate costume for Flash in the video game Justice League Heroes.

Earth One
Set in DC: Earth One, Wally is one of the children given powers from the Titans Project headed by Niles Caulder. Alongside Kole Weathers and Cassie Sandsmark, Wally is one of the first Titans to work for Caulder, even considering him a father. After a struggle with the other experimented children, Vic Stone, Tara Markov, Gar Logan, Tempest and Raven, a repenting Deathstroke and the alien Starfire, Wally turns on Caulder. In this universe, he takes on the name Impulse instead.

Elseworlds
An Elseworlds tale in Superboy vol. 4 Annual #1 (1994) shows a Wally West that had lost the use of his legs and had them replaced with bionic ones. With his artificial legs, Wally was not able to run at high speeds, though he could still move his arms at super-speed. This version of Wally died saving Hal Jordan from a yellow projectile.

Flash Annual
The Flash vol. 3 Annual #7 (1994, one of a series of Elseworlds annuals) shows a Flash who has become a superstar celebrity and film director. He was apparently left disabled by an attempt by Captain Cold to create a new Ice Age, which in this reality also resulted in the death of Barry Allen. Wally's film is repeatedly interrupted by Captain Cold's insistence that Wally's version is a lie (claiming that he had benevolent intentions and that Barry's death was a tragic accident) – much to Wally's horror, Captain Cold is given the authority to make changes to the film. During a confrontation in the carpark, Captain Cold's demonization of Barry Allen is ended when he is killed by a lightning bolt, which Wally suspects may be divine intervention.

Flashpoint
In the alternate timeline of the Flashpoint storyline, Wally West acts as an assistant and cameraman for his aunt Iris, who in this reality is a television reporter. Investigating Central City's hero, Citizen Cold, Wally discovers that his true identity is that of a former low-level criminal. Citizen Cold confronts him before he can reveal this information and freezes him in a block of ice. Wally was a childhood friend of Pied Piper, who arrives at Wally's lair and discovers Wally is killed by Citizen Cold. Pied Piper takes Wally's place in uncovering evidence of Citizen Cold's true identity. Afterwards, a funeral is held for Wally by his Aunt Iris, along with her husband John.

JLA: Another Nail
In JLA: Another Nail, Wally West (as Kid Flash) makes a brief appearance when all time periods meld together, seen flying with Wonder Girl (Donna Troy).

Kingdom Come

In Mark Waid's Kingdom Come, set on Earth—22, Wally has become the godlike embodiment of the Speed Force, being "everywhere at once", and "living between the ticks of a second". He keeps his home of Keystone City safe by patrolling it nonstop at super speed. He joins Superman's revived Justice League, and helps establish the "Gulag", a high tech prison for superhuman criminals. Wally is one of the few superheroes that survives the United Nations nuclear attack on the Gulag.

The sequel The Kingdom provides more background on Wally's future history. The Kingdom: Kid Flash #1 (February 1999) follows Wally's twin children, Barry and Iris West (originally mentioned in Mark Waid's The Life Story of the Flash, "written" by Iris Allen, where she describes her namesake in a positive light and Barry West as "a tragedy"). The twins have inherited their father's speed, but only Iris decides to become a superhero (as the new Kid Flash), while Barry is a slacker who uses his speed just to waste time. Wally at first rebuffs Iris' attempts to impress him, as he doesn't believe she's doing good for the right reasons. When Iris joins a team of second-generation heroes to travel into the past and confront Gog, Wally finally admits that she has earned the right to the name "Kid Flash".

Superman & Batman: Generations 2
In John Byrne's graphic novel Superman & Batman: Generations 2, characters from the DC Universe are shown to age in real time. In this series, Wally appears as the Flash in 1964, which is the year he first appeared in the mainstream DC universe as a founding member of the Teen Titans (though in this version, he is a founding member of the Justice League). By 1986, Wally has retired and been replaced by the fourth Flash (Carrie Allen, the daughter of Barry Allen). Wally's son, Jay West, in turn, replaces Carrie in 2008 to become the fifth Flash.

Collected editions
Wally West's stories from The Flash vol. 2 have been reprinted in several trade paperbacks and hardcover collections.

Collected editions featuring the other Flashes Jay Garrick and Barry Allen as well as Wally West:

In other media

Television
 Wally West as Kid Flash appears in The Superman/Aquaman Hour of Adventure, voiced by Tommy Cook. This version has black hair, an inverted version of his second comics costume, and trunks.
 Wally West as the Flash appears in series set in the DC Animated Universe (DCAU), voiced initially by Charlie Schlatter and subsequently by Michael Rosenbaum. This version works as a CSI like Barry Allen and is a founding member of the Justice League. First appearing in the Superman: The Animated Series episode "Speed Demons", he subsequently appears in Justice League, the Static Shock two-part episode "A League of Their Own", and Justice League Unlimited.
 Wally West as Kid Flash appears in Teen Titans, voiced again by Michael Rosenbaum.
 Wally West as Kid Flash appears in the Batman: The Brave and the Bold episode "Requiem for a Scarlet Speedster!", voiced by Hunter Parrish.
 Wally West as Kid Flash appears in the first two seasons of Young Justice, voiced by Jason Spisak. This version is a founding member of the "Team" and best friend of Dick Grayson who gained his powers from an attempt to recreate the accidents that gave Barry Allen and Jay Garrick theirs. West later enters a relationship with Artemis Crock and retires from crime-fighting, but is called back into action to help the Team and Justice League thwart the Reach's invasion, during which he is killed by a Reach weapon.
 Wally West as Kid Flash appears in Teen Titans Go!, voiced by Will Friedle.
 Wally West as Kid Flash makes a non-speaking cameo appearance in DC Nation Shorts.
 Wally West as the Flash appears in the Mad segment "That's What Super Friends Are For".
 Wally West as Kid Flash appears in the Robot Chicken episode "Bring a Sidekick to Work Day", voiced by Seth Green.

Video games
 Wally West as the Flash appears as a playable character in Justice League Task Force.
 Wally West as the Flash appears as a playable character in Justice League Heroes, voiced by Chris Edgerly.
 Wally West as the Flash appears in Justice League Heroes: The Flash voiced again by Chris Edgerly.
 Wally West as the Flash appears in DC Universe Online.
 Wally West as Kid Flash appears as a playable character in Young Justice: Legacy, voiced again by Jason Spisak.
 The DC Rebirth incarnation of Wally West / Flash appears as a playable character in the mobile version of Injustice: Gods Among Us.
 Wally West as the Flash makes a cameo appearance in Barry Allen's ending in Injustice 2.
 The DC Rebirth incarnation of Wally West / Flash and the Young Justice incarnation of Wally West / Kid Flash appear as playable characters in Lego DC Super-Villains, both voiced again by Jason Spisak.
 The DC Rebirth incarnation of Wally West / Flash appears as an unlockable playable character in DC Legends: Battle for Justice.

Reception
In 2011, IGN ranked Wally West #8 on their list of the "Top 100 Super Heroes of All Time", ahead of other speedster heroes, stating that "Wally West is one of the DCU's greatest heroes, even if he does not rank as the original Scarlet Speedster". In 2013, Wally West placed 6th on IGN's Top 25 Heroes of DC Comics, also ahead of other speedsters.

References

External links
 
 
 Flash (1986) at Don Markstein's Toonopedia. Archived from the original on July 30, 2016.
 DCU Guide: Wally West

Characters created by Carmine Infantino
Characters created by John Broome
Comics characters introduced in 1959
DC Comics characters who can move at superhuman speeds
DC Comics characters with accelerated healing
DC Comics characters with superhuman senses
DC Comics male superheroes
DC Comics metahumans
DC Comics scientists
DC Comics sidekicks
DC Comics child superheroes
Fictional characters who can manipulate reality
Fictional characters who can manipulate time
Fictional characters with dimensional travel abilities
Fictional characters with electric or magnetic abilities
Fictional characters who can manipulate sound
Fictional characters who can turn invisible
Fictional characters who can turn intangible
Fictional characters with air or wind abilities
Fictional characters with absorption or parasitic abilities
Fictional characters with anti-magic or power negation abilities
Fictional characters with slowed ageing 
Fictional characters with density control abilities
Fictional characters from Nebraska
Fictional characters displaced in time
Fictional criminologists
Flash (comics) characters
Male characters in comics
Teenage characters in comics
Time travelers